Chang'an University is a university located in Xi'an, China. Chang'an is the ancient name of Xi'an which means "Perpetual Peace" in Classical Chinese. It was one of the Double First Class University Plan and former "211 Project" key development universities and is directly under the administration of the Ministry of Education. It is a Chinese state Double First Class University identified by the central government of China. The university was formed by the merger of the former Xi'an Highway University, Xi'an Engineering Institute and Northwest Institute of Construction Engineering on April 18, 2000, and has five campuses in Xi'an.

Overview
Chang'an University, directly subordinate to the Ministry of Education, jointly run by the Ministry of Education and the Ministry of Transport, is one of national Double First Class University Plan and former 211 project universities in China. It was established in April 2000 by merging three former universities founded in the 1950s, namely, Xi'an Highway University, Xi'an Engineering Institute and Northwest Institute of Construction Engineering.

The university, covering an area of 2,980 mu, is located in Xi’an, well known for its cultural history. The university has five campuses (The Main, Yanta, Xiaozhai, Weishui and Taibai) located in Xi'an. The campuses play different roles in fostering students' educational experiences. The Weishui Campus is for undergraduates and the other ones are mainly for postgraduates and social practices. Moreover, Weishui Campus has the only comprehensive automobile proving ground within universities in China.

Chang’an University has three key laboratories of Ministry of Education, 10 Key Laboratories of the Ministry of Transport, Ministry of Land Recourse, Ministry Housing and Urban-Rural Construction and the Key Laboratory of Shaanxi Provincial. C.U also has 6 experimental teaching demonstration centers in Shaanxi Province, two approved Research Centers of the building the Ministry of Education Engineering project, in addition to the only university automobile proving ground.

References

External links
Chang'an University Website (Chinese)

 
Universities and colleges in Xi'an
Project 211
1951 establishments in China
Educational institutions established in 1951